Yandina may refer to:

 Yandina, Queensland, Australia
 Yandina, Solomon Islands, in the Russell Islands